The Wuhan Jinyintan Hospital is a public hospital located on Jinyintan Avenue in the Jiangjunlu Subdistrict, in the Dongxihu District of Wuhan, Hubei, China, and a unit directly under the Wuhan Municipal Health and Health Committee. Jinyintan Hospital specialises in infectious diseases. Jinyintan Hospital is one of the designated hospitals for emergency medical treatment in Hubei, including Wuhan. The hospital's president is Dr. Zhang Dingyu, a respiratory specialist. Its vice-director is Dr. Huang Chaolin.

At the start of the COVID-19 pandemic in China, many of those infected were treated here, including some of the first COVID-19 patients. The hospital saw 170 people with pneumonia symptoms by January 23, 2020, and nearly 500 COVID-19 patients at the peak of the pandemic in Wuhan. In January 2020, a group of researchers at the hospital published a paper in which they said they were concerned that the virus had "acquired the ability for efficient human transmission".

See also 
 Leishenshan Hospital
 Central Hospital of Wuhan
 Huoshenshan Hospital

References 

2008 establishments in China
COVID-19 pandemic in mainland China
Hospitals established in 2008
Hospitals in Wuhan